Sang-e Sefid (also Romanized as Sang-e Sefīd) is a village in Horr Rural District, Dinavar District, Sahneh County, Kermanshah Province, Iran. At the 2006 census, its population was 268, in 63 families.

References 

Populated places in Sahneh County